William or Bill Baroody may refer to:

William J. Baroody Sr. (1916–1980), American politician and president of the American Enterprise Institute, 1962–1978
William J. Baroody Jr. (1937–1996), American politician and president of the American Enterprise Institute, 1978–1986

See also 
 Baroody, a surname